Kuai, King of Yan (died 314 BC), ancestral name Jī (姬), clan name Yān (燕), personal name Kuài (噲), was the second king of the state of Yan in Warring States period of Chinese history. He ruled the state between 320 BC and 318 BC.

Kuai was the son of King Yi of Yan, he came to the throne after his father's death. In 318 BC, Lu Maoshou (鹿毛壽) persuaded him to resign the throne in favor of the powerful chancellor Zizhi (子之) to "prove his humility". Kuai did so and even removed his crown prince from power. In 314 BC, Crown Prince Ping (太子平) revolted against Zizhi, but was failed and killed in action. Encouraged by Mencius and other ministers, King Xuan of Qi sent Kuang Zhang (匡章) to attack Yan in 314 BC. Yan was practically conquered by Qi, and both Kuai and Zizhi were killed.

References

Monarchs of Yan (state)
314 BC deaths
Chinese kings
Yan (state)
Zhou dynasty nobility
Year of birth unknown
4th-century BC Chinese monarchs